The Love Embrace of the Universe, the Earth (Mexico), Myself, Diego, and Señor Xolotl is a 1949 painting by Frida Kahlo. Created in Mexico, the 70cm x 60.5cm painting was painted with oil on Masonite. It was featured on the reverse of the Series F $500 peso banknote, issued in 2010.

Themes and symbolism
The Love Embrace holds many layers of entwining embraces. The twofold face of the Universe, the light and dark background of planets and ethereal fog, is holding a murkier Earth (Mexico), whose breasts are lactating. The Earth (Mexico), with all her vegetation, is subsequently holding Frida Kahlo. Continuing further, Frida is then holding a nude Diego Rivera, whose forehead contains a third eye. This work is rich in symbolism, with multiple layers of meaning. However, the symbols are not unlike many of Kahlo's other works. Many art critics have contended that The Love Embrace portrays several of Frida's life struggles, including but not limited to: womanhood, motherhood and Diego Rivera.

Womanhood
Art historian Chelsey Miller says about the details of The Love Embrace, "In paintings such as The Love Embrace of the Universe, the Earth (Mexico), Diego, I and Señor Xolotl it is clear that Frida felt a deep connection to the Earth and to the feminine energies [of the Earth]". This statement is reflected in Kahlo's 1943 painting Roots, which depicts Kahlo with vegetation entwined throughout her body, and the above Earth (Mexico) in The Love Embrace which depicts vegetation all over her body. Kahlo repeated uses the allegorical iconography of using a woman's body to portray the earth and the source of life.

Motherhood
The myth of Kahlo’s infertility, has been refuted by Ankari's critical biography that makes extensive use of original sources. Indeed, rather than being infertile, Kahlo underwent multiple abortions. Her reasons included concern for passing on her father's epilepsy, her own ill health, and importantly, and her husband Diego Rivera's not wanting children, as evidenced by the abandonment of several women who had his children. Indeed, in a discussion with two mother's of Diego's children, they and Kahlo come to the conclusion that he himself is like a child, a conclusion clearly depicted in this work. However, that does not mean she was uninterested in fertility, and the roles of women in being fertile, and nurturing, and seeing that as an allegory to the earth's fertility and nurturing qualities, as depicted in the Earth (Mexico)'s lactating breasts, and the multiple levels of embrace.

Diego Rivera
In contrast to Diego being held as a baby in Frida's embrace, is pictured in The Love Embrace with a third eye on his forehead. This is similar to a depiction of Diego in Frida's Diego and I, also painted in 1949. The idea of placing a third eye on a person is common in order to reference a deity that is the epitome of wisdom and intelligence. Kahlo, who thought of Rivera as one of the most brilliant people in the world, revered his thinking and his works of art to a standard that was god-like, often referring to Diego as "The Master".

Notes

References
Ankari, Gannit. Frida Kahlo. London, Reaktion Books, 2013. 
Herrera, Hayden. Frida Kahlo: The Paintings. New York, Harper Collins, 1991.
Miller, Chelsey. Frida Kahlo: An Exploration of Art Themes and Symbolism., 2012.
Morrison, John. Frida Kahlo. Pennsylvania, Chelsea House Publications, 2003.
Stechler, Amy. The Life and Times of Frida Kahlo. Rhode Island, Daylight Films, 2005.

Paintings by Frida Kahlo
1949 paintings
Deer in art